Daniel Preston Mears is an American criminologist, a Fellow of the American Society of Criminology, and the Mark C. Stafford Professor of Criminology at the Florida State University College of Criminology & Criminal Justice. A 2011 ranking of American criminologists ranked Mears as the second most influential in terms of scholarly contributions. His research interests include the study of supermax prisons, immigration and crime, causes of offending, sentencing, and juvenile and criminal justice policy. He is the author of American Criminal Justice Policy: An Evaluation Approach to Increasing Accountability and Effectiveness (2010, Cambridge University Press), Prisoner Reentry in the Era of Mass Incarceration (2015, Sage Publications), Out-of-Control Criminal Justice: The Systems Improvement Solution for More Safety, Justice, Accountability, and Efficiency (2017, Cambridge University Press), and Fundamentals of Criminological and Criminal Justice Inquiry (Cambridge University Press).

References

External links
Mears website
Faculty page

Living people
American criminologists
1966 births
Florida State University faculty
University of Texas at Austin alumni
Haverford College alumni